The Governor of Kirovohrad Oblast is the head of executive branch for the Kirovohrad Oblast.

The office of Governor is an appointed position, with officeholders being appointed by the President of Ukraine, on recommendation from the Prime Minister of Ukraine, to serve a four-year term.

The official residence for the Governor is located in Kropyvnytskyi.

Governors
 Mykola Sukhomlyn (1992–1994, as the Presidential representative)
 Mykola Sukhomlyn (1995–1996, as the Governor)
 Mykhailo Hromovyi (1996–1998)
 Mykhailo Bashkirov (1998–1999, died in office)
 Valeriy Kalchenko (1999)
 Vasyl Motsnyi (1999–2003)
 Mykhailo Chernovol (2003–2004)
 Vasyl Kompaniets (2004–2005) 
 Eduard Zeinalov (2005–2006)
 Anatoliy Revenko (2006, acting)
 Vadym Chernysh (2006–2007)
 Anatoliy Revenko (2007, acting)
 Vasyl Motsnyi (2007–2009)
 Svitlana Nehoda (2009, acting)
 Volodymyr Movchan (2009–2010)
 Serhiy Larin (2010–2013)
 Andriy Nikolayenko (2013–2014)
 Oleksandr Petik (2014)
 Serhiy Kuzmenko (2014–2019)
 Serhiy Kovalenko (2019, acting)
 Svitlana Lobanova (2019, acting)
 Andriy Balon (2019–2020)
 Andrii Nazarenko (2020–2021)
 Valerii Zhaldak (since 15 April 2021, acting)
 Mariya Chorna (2021-2022)
 Andriy Raykovych (2022-)

Notes

References

Sources
 World Statesmen.org

External links
Government of Kirovohrad Oblast in Ukrainian

 
Kirovohrad Oblast